Johnnie Richard Wilburn Jr. (born April 27, 1943) is a former professional American football player. He played professionally as a wide receiver for five seasons in the National Football League (NFL) for the Pittsburgh Steelers. Wilburn played college football at the University of South Carolina.

References

1943 births
Living people
American football wide receivers
Pittsburgh Steelers players
South Carolina Gamecocks football players
Sportspeople from Portsmouth, Virginia
Players of American football from Virginia